Guy Barnett (born 4 April 1962) is a Liberal Party member of the Tasmanian House of Assembly representing the Division of Lyons. Since May 2021, he is also the Minister for Primary Industries and Water, Minister for Resources, Minister for Trade, Minister for Veterans' Affairs and Minister for Energy and Emissions Reduction in the Second Gutwein Ministry. He was previously a member of the Australian Senate.

He was born in Launceston, Tasmania, and attended the Launceston Church Grammar School and Geelong Grammar School. He gained a Bachelor of Laws and later a Master of Laws (Environmental Law) from the University of Tasmania. While at university, he served as president of the University of Tasmania Liberal Club.

After graduation, Barnett worked as a lawyer, political advisor and consultant.  He was appointed to the Senate in 2002 in replacement of Brian Gibson (resigned), elected for a full term in 2004, and served until his defeat at the 2010 federal election.

In the 2014 Tasmanian state election Barnett was elected to the Tasmanian House of Assembly representing the Division of Lyons. He was also appointed Parliamentary Secretary to the Premier.

On 18 July 2016, after the resignation of Adam Brooks, he was appointed Minister for Resources and Minister for Building and Construction.

Policy positions 

Barnett was a strong advocate for the War in Iraq, justifying the war in a speech to the senate on 20 March 2003.

He opposed same-sex marriage in the 2017 postal plebiscite.

References

1962 births
Living people
Liberal Party of Australia members of the Parliament of Australia
Members of the Australian Senate
Members of the Australian Senate for Tasmania
People educated at Launceston Church Grammar School
University of Tasmania alumni
Members of the Tasmanian House of Assembly
Liberal Party of Australia members of the Parliament of Tasmania
21st-century Australian politicians
People educated at Geelong Grammar School